Fresh Aire VI is an album by Mannheim Steamroller, released in 1986. The music is inspired by Greek mythology. The album was the band's seventh album and first Fresh Aire album to appear on the Billboard album chart, reaching #155 in January 1987.

Track listing
"Come Home to the Sea"  – 4:52
"Rhodes Suite: Twilight at Rhodes"  – 2:00
"Rhodes Suite: Night Festival at Rhodes"  – 3:53
"Rhodes Suite: Sunrise at Rhodes"  – 3:48
"The Olympics"  – 2:24
"Nepenthe"  – 5:30
"Orpheus Suite: Descent Into the Underworld"  – 4:08
"Orpheus Suite: Dialog With the Devil"  – 2:07
"Orpheus Suite: Ascent From Hell"  – 4:09
"Sirens" – 11:53
"Crash and the Call"
"The Dance"
"The Singing Contest"
"Farewell"
All tracks composed by Chip Davis

Personnel
Chip Davis – drums
Jackson Berkey – keyboards
London Symphony Orchestra
Cambridge Singers
Additional musicians on "The Olympics" - Eric Hansen, Ron Cooley, Dave Kappy, Denny Schneider, Dave Wompler, Jim Schanelic, Craig Fuller
Sirens/Emulator Voices – Liz Westphalen, Pam Kalal, Denise Fackler
Liner notes: Jim Shey, Classics Department, University of Wisconsin

References

1986 albums
6
American Gramaphone albums